The 1997 Atlantic Coast Conference men's basketball tournament took place from March 6–9 in Greensboro, North Carolina, at the Greensboro Coliseum. In what turned out to be Dean Smith's last season of coaching, North Carolina won the tournament, defeating a surprising NC State team in the final.

NC State became the first team in ACC history to advance past the quarterfinal round after playing in the First Round game. The ACC adopted the first-round game format in 1992 when Florida State joined the conference. After defeating top seed Duke in the quarterfinals, NC State beat fifth-seeded Maryland to advance to the championship game. Their Cinderella run through the tournament ended against rival North Carolina in the final. The 1997 NC State Wolfpack became the first team to play four games in the ACC Tournament and remained the lowest-seeded team to make the Tournament final until 2007.

Shammond Williams of North Carolina was named tournament MVP.

Bracket

AP rankings at time of tournament

Awards and honors

Everett Case Award

All Tournament Teams

First Team

Second Team

External links
 

Tournament
ACC men's basketball tournament
College sports tournaments in North Carolina
Basketball competitions in Greensboro, North Carolina
ACC men's basketball tournament
ACC men's basketball tournament